Ravenel is a commune in the Oise department in northern France.

It is located about 70 kilometres north of Paris.

See also
Communes of the Oise department

References

External links

 Website about Ravenel 

Communes of Oise